Lashlee is a surname. Notable people with the surname include:

Frank P. Lashlee (1937–2008), American politician
Rhett Lashlee (born 1983), American football coach